Lin Ivarsson (born 8 January 1996) is a Swedish former alpine ski racer.

World Cup results

Season standings

Results per discipline

Standings through 21 March 2021

World Championship results

Other results

European Cup results

Season standings

Results per discipline

Standings through 21 March 2021

Race podiums
 1 podiums – (1 DH)

References

External links
 
 

1996 births
Living people
Swedish female alpine skiers
21st-century Swedish women